Events during the year 1928 in Italy.

Incumbents
 Monarch: Victor Emmanuel III
 Prime Minister: Benito Mussolini

Events
April 12 – A bomb, directed against Italian Fascist leader Benito Mussolini, kills 18 people at the Milan Trade Fair.
May 24 – The airship Italia reaches the North Pole, with expedition leader Umberto Nobile on board. The ship crashes on its return journey.
June 24 – Umberto Nobile and survivors of the crash of the airship Italia are rescued by the crew of a Swedish aeroplane.
August 2 – Italy and Ethiopia sign the Italo-Ethiopian Treaty.

Births 
January 2 – Alberto Zedda, conductor and musicologist (died 2017)
January 9 – Domenico Modugno, singer, songwriter, actor and politician (died 1994)
June 5 – Umberto Maglioli, racing  driver (died 1999)
June 6 – Elio Sgreccia, cardinal (died 2019)
June 29 – Alfredo Biondi, politician and lawyer (died 2020)
July 4 – Giampiero Boniperti, footballer (died 2021)
July 26 – Francesco Cossiga, 8th President of Italy (died 2010)
October 16 – Nando Gazzolo, actor and voice actor (died 2015)
December 22
 Piero Angela, writer, journalist and television presenter  
 Luisa Massimo, pediatrician (died 2016)

Deaths
February 28 – Armando Diaz, 66, general, Marshal of Italy  
March 31 – Medardo Rosso, 70, sculptor
May 25 (lost in the crash of the airship Italia)
Aldo Pontremoli, 32, physicist
Renato Alessandrini, 37, explorer 
July 17 – Giovanni Giolitti, 85, 13th Prime Minister of Italy

References

 
1920s in Italy
Years of the 21st century in Italy
Italy
Italy